NTIC may refer to:

 National Training and Information Center
 Nigerian Turkish International Colleges
 Nexus: The Infinite City, a role-playing game